In classical rhetoric and logic, begging the question or assuming the conclusion is an informal fallacy that occurs when an argument's premises assume the truth of the conclusion. A question-begging inference is valid, in the sense that the conclusion is as true as the premise, but it is not a valid argument.

For example, the statement that "wool sweaters are superior to nylon jackets because wool sweaters have higher wool content" begs the question because this statement assumes that higher wool content implies being a superior material. Begging the question is a type of circular reasoning, and often occurs in an indirect way such that the fallacy's presence is hidden, or at least not easily apparent.

The phrase "begs the question" is also commonly used to mean "prompts a question" or "raises a question".

History 

The original phrase used by Aristotle from which begging the question descends is: τὸ ἐξ ἀρχῆς (or sometimes ἐν ἀρχῇ) αἰτεῖν, "asking for the initial thing". Aristotle's intended meaning is closely tied to the type of dialectical argument he discusses in his Topics, book VIII: a formalized debate in which the defending party asserts a thesis that the attacking party must attempt to refute by asking yes-or-no questions and deducing some inconsistency between the responses and the original thesis.

In this stylized form of debate, the proposition that the answerer undertakes to defend is called "the initial thing" (τὸ ἐξ ἀρχῆς, τὸ ἐν ἀρχῇ) and one of the rules of the debate is that the questioner cannot simply ask for it (that would be trivial and uninteresting). Aristotle discusses this in Sophistical Refutations and in Prior Analytics book II, (64b, 34–65a 9, for circular reasoning see 57b, 18–59b, 1).

The stylized dialectical exchanges Aristotle discusses in the Topics included rules for scoring the debate, and one important issue was precisely the matter of asking for the initial thing—which included not just making the actual thesis adopted by the answerer into a question, but also making a question out of a sentence that was too close to that thesis (for example, PA II 16).

The term was translated into English from Latin in the 16th century. The Latin version, "asking for the starting point", can be interpreted in different ways. (from ), in the post-classical context in which the phrase arose, means assuming or postulating, but in the older classical sense means petition, request or beseeching. Literally  means "assuming the premise" or "assuming the original point".

The Latin phrase comes from the Greek  ("asking the original point") in Aristotle's Prior Analytics II xvi 64b28–65a26:

Aristotle's distinction between apodictic science and other forms of nondemonstrative knowledge rests on an epistemology and metaphysics wherein appropriate first principles become apparent to the trained dialectician:

Thomas Fowler believed that  would be more properly called , which is literally "begging the question".

Definition 
To "beg the question" (also called ) is to attempt to support a claim with a premise that itself restates or presupposes the claim. It is an attempt to prove a proposition while simultaneously taking the proposition for granted.

When the fallacy involves only a single variable, it is sometimes called a hysteron proteron (Greek for "later earlier"), a rhetorical device, as in the statement:

Reading this sentence, the only thing one can learn is a new word in a more classical style (soporific), for referring to a more common action (induces sleep), but it does not explain why it causes that effect. A sentence attempting to explain why opium induces sleep, or the same, why opium has soporific quality, would be the following one:

A less obvious example from Fallacies and Pitfalls of Language: The Language Trap by S. Morris Engel:

This form of the fallacy may not be immediately obvious. Linguistic variations in syntax, sentence structure, and the literary device may conceal it, as may other factors involved in an argument's delivery. It may take the form of an unstated premise which is essential but not identical to the conclusion, or is "controversial or questionable for the same reasons that typically might lead someone to question the conclusion":

For example, one can obscure the fallacy by first making a statement in concrete terms, then attempting to pass off an identical statement, delivered in abstract terms, as evidence for the original. One could also "bring forth a proposition expressed in words of Saxon origin, and give us a reason for it the very same proposition stated in words of Norman origin", as here:

When the fallacy of begging the question is committed in more than one step, some authors dub it  (reasoning in a circle) or, more commonly, circular reasoning.

Begging the question is not considered a formal fallacy (an argument that is defective because it uses an incorrect deductive step). Rather, it is a type of informal fallacy that is logically valid but unpersuasive, in that it fails to prove anything other than what is already assumed.

Related fallacies 

Closely connected with begging the question is the fallacy of circular reasoning, a fallacy in which the reasoner begins with the conclusion. The individual components of a circular argument can be logically valid because if the premises are true, the conclusion must be true, and does not lack relevance. However, circular reasoning is not persuasive because a listener who doubts the conclusion also doubts the premise that leads to it.

Begging the question is similar to the complex question (also known as trick question or fallacy of many questions): a question that, to be valid, requires the truth of another question that has not been established. For example, "Which color dress is Mary wearing?" may be fallacious because it presupposes that Mary is wearing a dress. Unless it has previously been established that her outfit is a dress, the question is fallacious because she could be wearing an outfit that was not a dress, such as pants and no dress.

Another related fallacy is ignoratio elenchi or irrelevant conclusion: an argument that fails to address the issue in question, but appears to do so. An example might be a situation where A and B are debating whether the law permits A to do something.

Vernacular 
In vernacular English, begging the question (or equivalent rephrasing thereof) often occurs in place of "raises the question", "invites the question", "suggests the question", "leaves unanswered the question" etc.. Such preface is then followed with the question, as in: 
 "[...] personal letter delivery is at an all-time low... Which begs the question: are open letters the only kind the future will know?"
 "Hopewell's success begs the question: why aren't more companies doing the same?"
 "Spending the summer traveling around India is a great idea, but it does beg the question of how we can afford it."

Sometimes it is further confused with "dodging the question", an attempt to avoid it, or perhaps more often begging the question is simply used to mean leaving the question unanswered.

See also 

 Ambiguity
 Catch-22 (logic)
 Circular definition
 Consequentia mirabilis
 Euphemism treadmill
 Fallacies of definition
 
 Open-question argument
 Polysyllogism
 Presuppositional apologetics
 Regress argument
 Spin (propaganda)

Notes

References 

 Cohen, Morris Raphael, Ernest Nagel, and John Corcoran. An Introduction to Logic. Hackett Publishing, 1993. .
 Davies, Arthur Ernest. A Text-book of Logic. R.G. Adams and Company, 1915.
 Follett, Wilson. Modern American Usage: A Guide. Macmillan, 1966. .
 Gibson, William Ralph Boyce, and Augusta Klein. The Problem of Logic. A. and C. Black, 1908.
 Herrick, Paul. The Many Worlds of Logic. Oxford University Press, 2000. 
 Kahane, Howard, and Nancy Cavender. Logic and contemporary rhetoric: the use of reason in everyday life. Cengage Learning, 2005. .
 Kilpatrick, James. "Begging Question Assumes Proof of an Unproved Proposition". Rocky Mountain News (CO) 6 April 1997. Accessed through Access World News on 3 June 2009.
 Martin, Robert M. There Are Two Errors in the  Title of This Book: A sourcebook of philosophical puzzles, paradoxes, and problems. Broadview Press, 2002. .
 Mercier, Charles Arthur. A New Logic. Open Court Publishing Company, 1912.
 Mill, John Stuart. A system of logic, ratiocinative and inductive: being a connected view of the principles of evidence, and the methods of scientific investigation. J.W. Parker, 1851.
 Safire, William. "On Language: Take my question please!". The New York Times 26 July 1998. Accessed 3 June 2009.
 Schiller, Ferdinand Canning Scott. Formal logic, a scientific and social problem. London: Macmillan, 1912.
 Welton, James. "Fallacies incident to the method". A Manual of Logic, Vol. 2. London: W.B. Clive University Tutorial Press, 1905.

Barriers to critical thinking
Cognitive inertia
Dogmatism
Error
Fallacies
Ignorance
Informal fallacies